Jesús Samper Vidal (28 August 1950 – 18 December 2015) was a Spanish businessman and lawyer with holdings in many cities, as well as being the owner of the football team Real Murcia. He was born in  Madrid and died there.

References

Real Murcia
Spanish football chairmen and investors
1950 births
2015 deaths